The Bintang Temasek, Singapore's most prestigious national honour, which was instituted on 24 July 1970. The decoration is only awarded to members of the Singapore Armed Forces, the Singapore Police Force or the Singapore Civil Defence Force who have performed "acts of exceptional courage and skill or exhibited conspicuous devotion to duty in circumstances of extreme danger". The badge may be awarded posthumously, although it has never been awarded since its inception.

Recipients of the honour are entitled to use the post-nominal letters BT. The badge is to be worn on the left side of the outer garment suspended from a ribbon.

History 
The Bintang Temasek was conferred to the Prime Minister of Cambodia, Norodom Sihanouk during Lee Kuan Yew's state visit to Phnom Penh in 1967. It was awarded before being institutionalised in Singapore in 1970.

References

External links
Singapore Prime Minister's Office - The Star of Temasek

Civil awards and decorations of Singapore